Hall County Courthouse may refer to:

Old Hall County Courthouse (Georgia), Gainesville, Georgia
Hall County Courthouse (Nebraska), Grand Island, Nebraska
Hall County Courthouse (Texas), Memphis, Texas